Tallowa Dam, completed in 1976, is a concrete gravity dam with central overflow spillway, located on the Shoalhaven River, downstream from the river's confluence with the Kangaroo River.

The 'full operating storage' for Tallowa Dam refers only to the amount of water in the dam that is available to be transferred to Sydney and the Illawarra. Other water from Tallowa Dam is provided to Shoalhaven City Council for supply to local communities. Water is also released from the dam as environmental flows for the Shoalhaven River.

The construction of a large barrier across the river has meant that the means of travel for fish has been completely confounded. There was no longer any means for the fish to get to their spawning areas further upstream. An innovative fish lift was constructed in 2009 to allow the fish to be collected and transferred over the dam wall.

See also

List of reservoirs and dams in Australia

References

Further reading
 

Dams completed in 1976
Dams in New South Wales
Shoalhaven River